Jamkaran (also Romanized as  and ), also known as Jamgarân, Jam-e-Karân is a village in Qanavat Rural District, in the Central District of Qom County, Qom Province, Iran. At the 2006 census, its population was 8,368, in 1,747 families.

Jamkaran is located on the outskirts of Qom, and is the site of the Jamkaran Mosque, a popular pilgrimage site for Shia Muslims from all over the world. Shia belief has it that the Mahdi—the Twelfth Shia Imam, a figure from Shia eschatology who will lead the world to an era of universal peace—once appeared and offered prayers at Jamkaran. On Tuesday evenings large crowds of thousands gather at Jamkaran to pray and to drop a note to the Imam in a well at the site, asking for help with some problem.

References

External links

 Sydney Morning Herald, May 15, 2006: Iranian president backs messianic cult

Populated places in Qom Province
Qom County